Cyrtodactylus bugiamapensis is a gecko from Binh Phuoc and Lam Dong provinces, southern Vietnam.

Description

References

Further reading
Ziegler, Thomas, et al. "A new Cyrtodactylus (Squamata: Gekkonidae) from Phu Yen Province, southern Vietnam." Zootaxa 3686.4 (2013): 432–446.
Nguyen, Sang Ngoc, et al. "Phylogeny of the Cyrtodactylus irregularis species complex (Squamata: Gekkonidae) from Vietnam with the description of two new species." Zootaxa 3737.4 (2013): 399–414.

External links

Reptile Database

Cyrtodactylus
Endemic fauna of Vietnam
Reptiles of Vietnam
Reptiles described in 2012